The tallest dams in China are some of the tallest dams in the world. Many of the tallest are located in the southwestern part of the country (Guizhou, Sichuan, Yunnan) on rivers such as the Mekong, the Yangtze, and its upper stretch (Jinsha River) and tributaries (Yalong, Dadu, Min and Wu). The Yellow River in the western part of the country also hosts several among the tallest. Purposes for these high structures include flood control, irrigation and, predominantly, hydroelectric power. While beneficial, many throughout the country have been criticized for their effects on the environment, displacement of locals and effect on transboundary river flows. The tallest embankment dam in China is the  Nuozhadu Dam in Yunnan. At , Shuibuya Dam in Hubei is the world's tallest concrete-face rock-fill dam.

List

Complete

Under construction

See also
List of dams and reservoirs in China
List of tallest dams in the world

References

China